Ronald Eric Citrine, 3rd Baron Citrine of Wembley,  (19 May 1919 — 5 August 2006) was one of the Westminster Hospital medical students who assisted at Bergen-Belsen concentration camp in 1945. In 1955, he registered as a medical practitioner in New Zealand and lived at Paihia.

References 

20th-century British medical doctors
3
London medical students who assisted at Belsen
1945 in medicine
1919 births
2006 deaths

Citrine